The 2000 WNBA season was the fourth season for the Charlotte Sting. The team missed the playoffs for the first time in franchise history. They posted the worst record in the East and in franchise history, where that would remain until the 2005 season.

Offseason

Expansion Draft
The following players were selected in the draft:
 Stephanie McCarty (8th pick, Indiana Fever)
 Sharon Manning (14th pick, Miami Sol)

WNBA Draft

Trades

Regular season

Season standings

Season schedule

Player stats

References

Charlotte Sting seasons
Charlotte
Charlotte Sting